Kazi Shahidullah is a Bangladeshi academic and incumbent Chairman of Bangladesh University Grants Commission. He previously served as the vice-chancellor of the National University of Bangladesh during 2009–2013. He taught history at Dhaka University.

References

Living people
Dhaka College alumni
University of Dhaka alumni
University of British Columbia alumni
University of Western Australia alumni
Vice-Chancellors of National University Bangladesh
Place of birth missing (living people)
Date of birth missing (living people)
Year of birth missing (living people)